Sister Mary Irma Hilger (July 12, 1917 – February 22, 2003) was an American religious sister, who trained as a nurse and founded the St. Jude Hospital and nurse's training school on the Caribbean island of St. Lucia. She has been called the "Florence Nightingale of St. Lucia".

Early life
Mary Irma Hilger was born on July 12, 1917, in Ost, Reno County, Kansas to Katherine May and Peter M. Hilger. She joined the Sisters of the Sorrowful Mother in 1935 and went on to obtain a bachelor's degree and master's degree in nursing from Saint Louis University, in St. Louis, Missouri.

Career
In 1955, Hilger became the supervisor of obstetrics at St. Francis Hospital in Wichita, Kansas. In 1961, she was posted to St. Lucia in the West Indies, along with four other sisters. Her master's work had concerned the feasibility of establishing a nursing training program on the island. The nurses began their training program, the first nursing school on the island, at the Victoria Hospital in Castries.

Traversing the island in 1962, Hilger discovered an abandoned military hospital on the former United States Beane Air Force Base facility, near Vieux Fort which had been closed in 1947. She began negotiating with the government to repurpose the buildings. By the beginning of 1964, the Sisters of the Sorrowful Mother received donated land from the Devaux family. The following year, Hilger took businessman Hogarth Belizaire to evaluate the military site and they approached Chief Minister John Compton with their plan. The government agreed to the plan in 1965 and after several months of rehabilitating the property, which had been unused for twenty years, the hospital officially opened on September 5, 1966. Operating as a charity hospital at no charge to patients and a school, the first class of nurses graduated in October 1969. Hilger was the hospital administrator until 1976.

Returning to the United States in November 1976, Hilger became the administrator of the Franciscan Villa in Broken Arrow, Oklahoma between 1979 and 1982. She returned to St. Francis Regional Medical Center of Wichita in 1982, working as a receptionist until her retirement in 1997. She remained committed to St. Jude's, collecting medicines, supplies and monetary donations to assist the care givers in the Caribbean.

Death and legacy
Hilger died on February 22, 2003, in Broken Arrow, Oklahoma. She is remembered as the "Florence Nightingale of St. Lucia", for establishing the hospital, which grew to serve 70,000 residents on the south side of the island. The hospital was destroyed by fire in 2009 and was forced to operate from a temporary quarters in a former stadium. Government plans to rebuild it were unfinished in 2017.

References

Citations

Bibliography

 
 
 

 

 

1917 births
2003 deaths
People from Reno County, Kansas
20th-century American Roman Catholic nuns
American nurses
American women nurses
Catholics from Kansas
21st-century American Roman Catholic nuns